Moscow Penny Ante is the third studio album by American punk rock band Dead to Me, released through Fat Wreck Chords on October 25, 2011.

Pre-release
In an interview before the album's release, band member, Tyson Annicharico, stated his pride in the album. He suggested that this pride came from the band's musical variety. He believes that the band cannot be "pigeon-holed" into one genre but was able to experiment musically. A review on R5 Productions supported this view, commenting, "as usual, it’s nothing less than the exact opposite of what you’d expect from Dead To Me."

On the name of the album, Annicharico suggests that the title has a double meaning. 'Penny Ante' was the term Malcolm X used to describe small-time criminals - those not big enough to be taken seriously by criminal gangs. He describes the band's position in the music industry as analogous to 'penny ante' criminals, saying "we scrape by and do what we can, but we think we run a pretty good hustle as it were."

Track listing

Personnel

Dead to Me
 Tyson "Chicken" Annicharico – bass guitar, lead vocals
 Sam Johnson – guitar, vocals
 Ken Yamazaki – guitar, backing vocals
 Ian Anderson – drums

References

2011 albums
Dead to Me albums
Fat Wreck Chords albums